ANPR may refer to:

 Anagrafe nazionale della popolazione residente (National register office for the resident population), the national register office of Italy
 Automatic number-plate recognition